Rajiaka is a village in Rewari tehsil of Rewari district in the Indian state of Haryana.

Location 
Rajiaka is situated at a distance of 12 km from Rewari in the west-south direction on State highway- 15.

History 
The village was founded by Rajaram Yadav of Khadulia Gotra. And after his name village named as Rajiaka.
The village led Ahirwal into serving the nation with each house being proud of at least one soldier and/or officer in the Indian Armed Forces.

Occupation 
Main occupation of people is agriculture and government/private jobs. Some villagers are employed in government services and many people are doing private jobs in other states and countries.

Transport 
Rajiaka is connected to nearby villages through the road network with presence of State Transport Service and Private Bus Services which link it to Rewari and other villages.

Geography 

Notable people 

Notable people born in Rajiaka.

1. Master Kishan Lal was Pioneer in Education of his time and encouraged people to provide high quality education to their children.

2. Master Dayaram Yadav was serving as a school teacher for more than three decades.

3.Gajender Yadav, B.Tech. from Kurukshetra University and M.Tech. from NIT JAIPUR

4. Vineet Kumar, B.Tech. from NIT Bhopal.

5. Tula Ram, B.Tech. from IIT Roorkee.

6. Manender Yadav, B.Tech. from NIT Rourkela.

7. Dinesh Kumar, B.Tech. from Deenbandhu Chhotu Ram University of Science and Technology.

8. Parmod Yadav, B.Tech. From ['Singhania University' & 'Job-Team leader GOSHI INDIA AUTO PARTS P.Ltd. BAwal.MNC']

9. Amit Yadav, B.tech from SMEC neemrana

10. Sunil Kumar, Ph.D. from Indian Statistical Institute.

The village is also notable for producing national level players in wrestling and hockey.

References 

Villages in Rewari district